Ara Eivissa (Ara) is a political coalition formed in Ibiza in 2019. It was created ahead of the 2019 Spanish general election, the 2019 Balearic election and the 2019 local elections as an electoral alliance formed by Let's Win Ibiza (Guanyem), Republican Left of Catalonia (esquerra) and Equo (eQuo).

Composition

References

Political parties in the Balearic Islands
Political parties established in 2019
Republican Left of Catalonia
Unidas Podemos